I Love Your Lifestyle is a Swedish emo band from Jönköping, currently based in Gothenburg and Malmö. The band was formed in 2012, and has released three full length albums. Their second album The Movie received a positive review from Pitchfork, who described their music as "a combustible flashpoint where emo’s unhinged rhythms meets indie-pop song forms".

Their third album, No Driver, was released by Counter Intuitive Records and Dog Knight Productions on 23 October 2020.

Discography

Studio albums
We Go Way Back (2016)
The Movie (2019)
No Driver (2020)

EPs
I Love Your Lifestyle (2013)
I Was a Loser in School (2015)

Singles
My Yard (2015)
Jazz Nights (2015)
Touch / Fire (2017)
23 (2019)
Dreamy Dreams (2019)
Shilly-Shally (2020)
Car (2020)

References

Musical groups established in 2012
Swedish indie rock groups
Emo revival groups
2012 establishments in Sweden